is a song recorded by Japanese singer Masami Okui, from the album Ma-KING. It was released as the album's third single on May 21, 1997, through Starchild Records. The title track is the theme song to the TX anime series Revolutionary Girl Utena. It was also featured in the animated film Adolescence of Utena. A double A-side CD single featuring both "Rondo-Revolution" and the ending theme to Revolutionary Girl Utena, "Truth" by Luca Yumi, was released simultaneously by Starchild Records.

Background
"Rondo-Revolution" was written by Okui and composed, arranged and produced by Toshiro Yabuki. The title of the song constitutes an ateji pronunciation of the kanji 輪舞 (rinbu) as the musical term Rondo. The director of Revolutionary Girl Utena Kunihiko Ikuhara revealed in a blog entry about the song that its initial working title was "Take my revolution".

Composition
The song is composed in the key of D minor and set to a tempo of 132 beats per minute. Okui's vocals span from A3 to F5.

Chart performance
"Rondo-Revolution" (KIDA-149) debuted at number 43 on the weekly Oricon Singles Chart, with 8,000 copies sold. The single charted for two weeks and sold a reported total of 12,000 copies. The double A-side version (KIDA-151) of the single entered the Oricon Singles Chart at number 26, with 16,000 copies sold. It charted for four consecutive weeks and sold a reported total of 34,000 copies.

Track listing

Charts

"Rondo-Revolution" edition

"Rondo-Revolution" / "Truth" edition

Sales

References

1997 songs
1997 singles
Anime songs
Masami Okui songs
Revolutionary Girl Utena